Barne Pernot (born 11 June 1999) is a German professional footballer who plays as a defensive midfielder or centre-back for  club SC Verl.

Career
After playing youth football with SV GW Todenbüttel, St. Pauli and Holstein Kiel and senior football with Holstein Kiel II, he signed for SC Verl on a two-year contract in July 2020.

References

External links
 
 

1999 births
Living people
German footballers
Association football midfielders
Association football central defenders
Holstein Kiel II players
SC Verl players
Regionalliga players
3. Liga players